Springfield Robertson County Airport  is a public use airport located three nautical miles (6 km) northwest of the central business district of Springfield, a city in Robertson County, Tennessee, United States. It is owned by the Springfield/Robertson Airport Board. This airport is included in the National Plan of Integrated Airport Systems for 2011–2015, which categorized it as a general aviation facility.

Facilities and aircraft 
Springfield Robertson County Airport covers an area of 148 acres (60 ha) at an elevation of 706 feet (215 m) above mean sea level. It has one runway designated 4/22 with an asphalt surface measuring 5,505 by 100 feet (1,678 x 30 m).

For the 12-month period ending December 31, 2015, the airport had 14,300 aircraft operations, an average of 39 per day: 84% general aviation, 13% military, and 3% air taxi. At that time there were 53 aircraft based at this airport: 86% single-engine, 9% multi-engine, 4% helicopters, and 1% ultra-light.

References

External links 
 McCauley Aviation Inc., the fixed-base operator (FBO)
 Springfield-Robertson County (M91) at Tennessee DOT Airport Directory
 Aerial image as of March 1997 from USGS The National Map
 
 

Airports in Tennessee
Buildings and structures in Robertson County, Tennessee
Transportation in Robertson County, Tennessee